The Origin of Consciousness in the Breakdown of the Bicameral Mind is a 1976 book by the Princeton psychologist, psychohistorian and consciousness theorist Julian Jaynes (1920-1997). The book addresses the problematic nature of consciousness – “the ability to introspect” – which in Jaynes’ view must be distinguished from sensory awareness and other processes of cognition. Jaynes presents his proposed solution: that consciousness is a “learned behavior” based more on language and culture than on biology; this solution, in turn, points to the origin of consciousness in ancient human history rather than in metaphysical or evolutionary processes; furthermore, archaeological and historical evidence indicates that prior to the “learning” of consciousness, human mentality was what Jaynes called "the bicameral mind" – a mentality based on verbal hallucination.

The first edition was released in January 1977 in English. Two later editions, in 1982 and in 1990, were released by Jaynes with additions but without alterations.  It was Jaynes's only book, and it is still in print, in several languages. In addition to numerous reviews and commentaries, there are several summaries of the book's material, for example, in the journal Behavioral and Brain Sciences, in lectures and discussions published in Canadian Psychology, and in Art/World.

Jaynes's theories

In his book, Jaynes reviews what one of his early critics acknowledged as the “spectacular history of failure”  to explain consciousness – “the human ability to introspect”. Abandoning the assumption that consciousness is innate, Jaynes explains it instead as a learned behavior that “arises ... from language, and specifically from metaphor.” With this understanding, Jaynes then demonstrated that ancient texts and archeology can reveal a history of human mentality alongside the histories of other cultural products. His analysis of the evidence led him not only to place the origin of consciousness during the 2nd millennium BCE but also to hypothesize the existence of an older non-conscious “mentality that he called the bicameral mind, referring to the brain’s two hemispheres”.

In the third chapter of the book, "The Mind of the Iliad", Jaynes states that people of the era had no consciousness.

Jaynes wrote an extensive afterword for the 1990 edition of his book, in which he addressed criticisms and clarified that his theory has four separate hypotheses: consciousness is based on and accessed by language; the non-conscious bicameral mind is based on verbal hallucinations; the breakdown of bicameral mind precedes consciousness, but the dating is variable; the 'double brain' of bicamerality is not today's functional lateralization of the cerebral hemispheres. He also expanded on the impact of consciousness on imagination and memory, notions of The Self, emotions, anxiety, guilt, and sexuality.

Reception and influence
The Origin of Consciousness in the Breakdown of the Bicameral Mind was a successful work of popular science, selling out the first print run before a second could replace it. The book was nominated for the National Book Award in 1978, and received dozens of positive book reviews, including those by well-known critics such as John Updike in The New Yorker, Christopher Lehmann-Haupt in the New York Times, and Marshall McLuhan in the Toronto Globe and Mail. Articles on Jaynes and his ideas appeared in Time magazine and Psychology Today in 1977, and in Quest/78 in 1978.

It is mentioned in Richard Dawkins's 2006 work The God Delusion as "one of those books that is either complete rubbish or a work of consummate genius, nothing in between! Probably the former, but I'm hedging my bets."
Jaynes's work on consciousness has influenced philosophers Daniel Dennett, Susan Blackmore, and Ken Wilber, and the bicameral model of the cerebral hemispheres has influenced schizophrenia researchers Henry Nasrallah and Tim Crow.

The theory of bicamerality has been cited in thousands of books and articles, both scientific and popular. It inspired early investigations of auditory hallucination by psychologist Thomas Posey and clinical psychologist John Hamilton. With further research in the late 1990s using new brain imaging technology, Jaynes's ideas received renewed attention and recognition for contributing to a rethinking of auditory hallucinations and mental illness.

Conferences
There have been a number of conferences and symposiums dedicated to Julian Jaynes's theory. These include: 
 The McMaster-Bauer Symposium on Consciousness at McMaster University was held in November 1983, with lectures and discussion by Julian Jaynes, Daniel Dennett, and others. 
 A symposium on Jaynes's theory was held at Harvard University in December 1988, with lectures and discussion by Julian Jaynes, Daniel Dennett, and others.
 The Julian Jaynes Conference on Consciousness was organized by Professor Scott Greer at the University of Prince Edward Island in 2006 and 2008 (a one-day symposium was held from 2002-2005), and featured speakers such as Daniel Dennett, Michael Gazzaniga, Richard Restak, Karl Pribram, and many others. 
 At the April 2008 "Toward a Science of Consciousness" Conference held in Tucson, Arizona, Marcel Kuijsten (Executive Director and Founder of the Julian Jaynes Society) and Brian J. McVeigh (University of Arizona) hosted a workshop devoted to Jaynesian psychology.  At the same conference, a panel devoted to Jaynes was also held, with John Limber (University of New Hampshire), Marcel Kuijsten, John Hainly (Southern University), Scott Greer (University of Prince Edward Island), and Brian J. McVeigh presenting relevant research. At the same conference the philosopher Jan Sleutels (Leiden University) gave a paper on Jaynesian psychology. 
 In June 2013, The Julian Jaynes Society Conference on Consciousness and Bicameral Studies was held in Charleston, West Virginia. The multidisciplinary program featured 26 speakers over three full days, including keynote talks by Professor Roy Baumeister, Professor Merlin Donald, and Dr. Dirk Corstens.

Publications
A growing number of publications discuss and expand on Julian Jaynes's theory. These include:

 Reflections on the Dawn of Consciousness: Julian Jaynes's Bicameral Mind Theory Revisited (2007), which contains several of Jaynes's essays along with chapters by scholars from a variety of disciplines expanding on his ideas.
 The Julian Jaynes Collection (2012), which gathers together many of the lectures and articles by Jaynes relevant to his theory (including some that were previously unpublished), along with interviews and question and answer sessions where Jaynes addresses misconceptions about the theory and extends the theory into new areas.
 The Minds of the Bible: Speculations on the Cultural Evolution of Human Consciousness (2013) by Rabbi James Cohn, which examines the evidence for Jaynes's theory in the Old Testament.
 Gods, Voices, and the Bicameral Mind (2016), which includes essays on a variety of aspects of Jaynes's theory, including ancient history, language, the development of consciousness in children, and the transition from bicamerality to consciousness in ancient Tibet.
 How Religion Evolved: Explaining the Living Dead, Talking Idols, and Mesmerizing Monuments (2016) by Brian J. McVeigh 
 The 'Other' Psychology of Julian Jaynes: Ancient Languages, Sacred Visions, and Forgotten Mentalities (2018) by Brian J. McVeigh 
 The Psychology of the Bible: Explaining Divine Voices and Visions (2020) by Brian J. McVeigh 
 Conversations on Consciousness and the Bicameral Mind: Interviews with Leading Thinkers on Julian Jaynes's Theory (2022) edited by Marcel Kuijsten

Scholarly commentary
"The Origin of Consciousness in the Breakdown of the Bicameral Mind is one of those lush, overambitious books … that readers, on finishing it, find that they think about the world quite differently." — Tanya Luhrmann, Ph.D., Professor of Anthropology, Stanford University, in "What Book Changed Your Mind?", Chronicle of Higher Education
"[Jaynes] has one of the clearest and most perspicuous defenses of the top-down approach [to consciousness] that I have ever come across." — Daniel Dennett, Ph.D., Professor of Philosophy, Tufts University, in Brainchildren
"Julian Jaynes’s theories for the nature of self-awareness, introspection, and consciousness have replaced the assumption of their almost ethereal uniqueness with explanations that could initiate the next change in paradigm for human thought." — Michael A. Persinger, Ph.D., Professor of Behavioral Neuroscience, Laurentian University, in Reflections on the Dawn of Consciousness
"[Jaynes'] proposal is too interesting to ignore." — David Eagleman, in Incognito: The Secret Lives of the Brain

Controversy and criticism
In general, Jaynes is respected as a lecturer and a historian of psychology. Marcel Kuijsten, founder of the Julian Jaynes Society, asks why, in the decades after the book's publication, "there have been few in-depth discussions, either positive or negative", rejecting as too simplistic the criticism that "Jaynes was wrong."

Jaynes described the range of responses to his book as “from people who feel [the ideas are] very important all the way to very strong hostility. ... When someone comes along and says consciousness is in history, it can’t be accepted. If [psychologists] did accept it, they wouldn’t have the motivation to go back into the laboratory ...”

W. T. Jones, a sociologist who has been described as "one of Jaynes's most thoroughgoing critics", asked in 1979, "Why, despite its implausibility, is [Jaynes's] book taken seriously by thoughtful and intelligent people?" Jones agreed with Jaynes that "the language in which talk about consciousness is conducted is metaphorical", but he contradicted the basis of Jaynes's argument – that metaphor creates consciousness – by asserting that "language (and specifically metaphor) does not create, it discovers, the similarities that language marks". Jones also argued that three "cosmological orientations" biased Jaynes’s thinking: 1) "hostility to Darwin" and natural selection; 2) a "longing for 'lost bicamerality'" (Jones accused Jaynes of holding that "we would all be better off if 'everyone' were once again schizophrenic"); 3) a "desire for a sweeping, all-inclusive formula that explains everything that has happened". Jones concluded that "... those who share these biases ... are likely to find the book convincing; those who do not will reject [Jaynes's] arguments ..."

The neurological model in The Origin of Consciousness in the Breakdown of the Bicameral Mind was a radical neuroscientific hypothesis that was based on research novel at the time, mainly on the Gazzaniga's "split-brain" theory. Today, his hypotheses are still controversial to many in the field. However, the more general idea of a "divided self" (contrasted with a "unitary self") has found support from psychological and neurological studies, and many of the historical arguments made in the book remain supported, and have not been disproven (although due to the theoretical nature of the work, it may require further study to experimentalize some of the ideas).

An early criticism by philosopher Ned Block argued that Jaynes had confused the emergence of consciousness with the emergence of the concept of consciousness. In other words, according to Block, humans were conscious all along but did not have the concept of consciousness and thus did not discuss it in their texts. Daniel Dennett countered that for some things, such as money, baseball, or consciousness, one cannot have the thing without also having the concept of the thing. Moreover, it is arguable that Block misinterpreted the nature of what Jaynes claimed to be a social construction.

Translations
The Origin of Consciousness in the Breakdown of the Bicameral Mind has been translated into at least seven foreign languages:

In popular culture
The idea of bicamerality has influenced novelists Philip K. Dick, William S. Burroughs, Neal Stephenson and Robert J. Sawyer.

In Neil Gaiman's 2001 novel American Gods, there is an allusion to Jaynes' theory. The novel's protagonist, Shadow, discusses theories about the origins of gods with a hitchhiker he picks up; the hitchhiker says "'I read some book about brains... how five thousand years ago the lobes of the brain fused and before that people thought when the right lobe of the brain said anything it was the voice of the god telling them what to do'."

In Douglas Adams' unfinished novel The Salmon of Doubt (2002), Dirk Gently obtains copies of the Financial Times "from an old tramp in return for a blanket, some cider, and a copy of The Origin of Consciousness in the Breakdown of the Bicameral Mind."

In 2009, American novelist Terence Hawkins published The Rage of Achilles, a re-telling of Homer's The Iliad that imagines the hero's transition from bicameral mentality to consciousness.

See also 
For other claims and analysis of Homer's Iliad and Odyssey, see
 Wine-dark sea
 Studies on Homer and the Homeric Age

Notes

References

External links 
 The book at Julian Jaynes Society's website
 Book review by Scott Alexander

1976 non-fiction books
Books about consciousness
English-language books